This article features the 1992 CONCACAF U-20 Tournament qualifying stage. The qualifying tournament was only for Caribbean teams. Bermuda automatically qualified, as well as the North American Canada, Mexico and the United States, and the Central American Costa Rica and Honduras. Matches were played in November and December 1991. Seventeen teams entered the qualifying stage and five teams qualified for the main tournament in Canada.

Group A

Group B

Group C

Group D

See also
 1992 CONCACAF U-20 Tournament

External links
Results by CONCACAF

CONCACAF U-20 Championship qualification
Qual
1991 in youth association football